The W62 was an American thermonuclear warhead designed in the 1960s and manufactured from March 1970 to June 1976. Used on some Minuteman III ICBMs, it was partially replaced by the W78 starting in December 1979, and fully replaced by W87 warheads removed from MX Peacekeeper missiles and retired in 2010.

History
The concept of the W62 began in 1961 with an air force study into reentry vehicles for "multiple mode", what Multiple Reentry Vehicles (MRV) was then called. The study proposed a Mark 12 RV for Minuteman, a Mark 13 RV for Titan II and a Mark 14 RV for Titan I and Atlas. The primary goal of these new RVs was to overcome terminal anti-ballistic missile defenses.  One of the earliest effects tests of this new RV was shot Marshmallow of Operation Dominic in 1962. In August 1962 the Mark 12 RV developed into the twin-RV concept, consisting of two different reentry vehicles: a "light" and "heavy", both called the Mark 12.

In January 1963, development of a MRV system for Minuteman was authorized. At this time, the navy asked to become an observer for the program. In April 1963, the system feasibility study was released. Three warhead designs of varying hardness, yield and weight were proposed for the light warhead, and two for the heavy warhead.

The concept of multiple independent reentry vehicles (MIRV) was developed in late 1962 and early 1963. Several independent inventors are credited with the idea, with the technological concept originating in the Able-Star and Trantstage systems. Able-Star was a system for the Thor rocket that allowed for the deployment of multiple satellites from a single rocket into multiple orbits. Transtage was a highly maneuverable post-boost control system developed without any specific mission in mind, but was used for the IDCSP defense communication satellite system. Further developments included the miniaturization of thermonuclear weapons.

In October 1963, the director for defense research requested that the air force and navy cooperate on the Mark 12 program so that the warhead could be used interchangeably on both the Minuteman and Polaris missiles. The immediate effect was for the air force and navy to adopt common vulnerability requirement for the warhead, which was complicated by the navy having more stringent vulnerability requirements than the air force. 

In 1964, the heavy warhead was spun off as the Mark 17 warhead, which became the W67 warhead, and in March, there were further investigations into even lighter warheads than the baseline Mark 12 light design. The initial secondary stage in the warhead was of the "conventional design", but in July the design was changed to allow for more forward placing of the warhead, reducing total weight. The first test of the secondary was in September. In November, the system specifications were changed to support development of an MIRV system.

A series of changes were made to the weapon requirements in regards to hardening in 1964 and 1965. This included a second weapon effects test, Gumdrop of Operation Whetstone 21 April 1965. These led to changes in the primary stage design in March 1965. In 1966, significant effort was devoted towards hardening the warhead systems against weapon effects to prevent x-ray pin-down. In the same year, the warhead was delayed due to RV ablation causing some RVs to break up on reentry.

In October 1967, navy cooperation on the Mark 12 was terminated, as the need to make the warhead compatible with both air force and navy requirements ultimately lead to a weapon that was less suitable for either application. 

The first production W62 was produced in April 1970. The warhead was partially replaced by the W78 starting in December 1979 and fully replaced by the W87 warhead in 2010, thereafter it was retired and dismantled.

Design

The yield of the W62 is publicly believed to be . The weapon had contact and airburst fuzing modes. Development of the warhead required "numerous" nuclear tests between 1963 and 1968. Some of these tests were to develop the primary and for one-point safety testing of the system.

Two or three warheads were carried on Minuteman III, depending on the desired maximum range. Proposals to put the W62 on Titan II were to use two warhead buses, carrying eight warheads each, for a total of sixteen warheads.

A total of 1,725 W62 warheads were produced during its production run. The last W62 was dismantled in August 2010.

See also
 List of nuclear weapons

Notes

References

External links
Dismantling History: The Final W62 Warhead

Nuclear warheads of the United States
Military equipment introduced in the 1970s